Gangajhari railway station serves Gangajhari and surrounding villages in Gondia district in Maharashtra, India.

References

Railway stations in Gondia district
South East Central Railway zone